Etielloides longipalpus is a species of snout moth in the genus Etielloides. It was described by Ying-Dang Ren and Hou-Hun Li in 2006 and is known from China.

References

Moths described in 2006
Endemic fauna of China
Phycitinae